Gospel Mission is an album by American jazz trumpeter, composer and arranger Shorty Rogers, issued by Capitol Records  in 1963. It would be the last album released under Roger's leadership for two decades when he focussed on arrangements for film and TV.

Reception

Allmusic awarded the album 3 stars.

Track listing 
All compositions by Shorty Rogers.

 "Gospel Mission" 	
 "Gonna Shout - All The Way to Heaven" 	
 "Wake Up and Shout" 	
 "Sit Down Shorty" 	
 "Freedom's Coming" 	
 "Swinging Gold Chariots" 	
 "Preacherman Gonna Stop By Here" 	
 "Great Days Ahead" 	
 "Climbing to Heaven" 	
 "Joshua's Saxes" 	
 "We´re On Our Way Shout" 	
 "Talk About Rain"

Personnel 
Shorty Rogers - flugelhorn, arranger, conductor
Unidentified orchestra featuring:
Plas Johnson - tenor saxophone

References 

Shorty Rogers albums
1963 albums
Capitol Records albums
Albums arranged by Shorty Rogers
Albums produced by Nick Venet